QAC may stand for:

Quasi-algebraically closed field in mathematics
Quaternary ammonium cation in organic chemistry
Quaternary ammonium compound in organic chemistry
Queen Alexandra College, a specialist college for students above the age of sixteen with visual impairment and other disabilities
Quilmes Atlético Club, an Argentine sports club based in the Quilmes district of Greater Buenos Aires
QA/QC, quality assurance and control
Queen Anne's County, Maryland
QAC, quaque ante cibum; medical abbreviation, before every meal
 QA·C is a commercial static code analysis software tool produced by Programming Research Limited
 Qatar Aeronautical College, a flight training college in Doha, Qatar

See also